Alice Decaux, born 10 April 1985 at Abidjan, is a French athlete, who specializes in the 60 meter hurdles and 100 meters hurdles.

Career  
She was eliminated in the 60 meters hurdles semifinals at Doha world Championships, Saturday 13 March 2010, placing 8th and last with a time of 8.23s.
A year later, she seemed to have turned a corner by running 7.97s in the final of the Indoors French championship, making her a serious contender for the podium 2011 Indoors European Championships at Paris, in France.
But on 4 March 2011, at Palais Omnisports de Paris-Bercy, she failed in the semifinal of the 60 meter hurdles, where  she failed on the fifth and final hurdle before which she was doing well.

In 2012, she stopped being coached by former French hurdles champion  Patricia Girard.

In 2013, she further improved her personal best on 13 July on the occasion of French Championships running 12.70s. However a few days later she was declared positive for the use of amphetamines, as a result of a check performed during the 23 June 2013 European Team Championships. She was suspended six months by the IAAF and therefore excluded from the French delegation for World Athletic Games at Moscow.

Prize list

National 
 Champion of France of 60 meter hurdles in 2010 (8.06s) and 2011 (7.97s)   
  3rd at Championships of France in 60 meters hurdles in 2009   
  3rd at Championships of France in 60 meters hurdles in 2007 Aubière (Clermont-Ferrand)   
  3rd at the French Championships of 100 meters hurdles in 2008 to Albi (13.28s)   
  1st at the French Championships of 100 meters hurdles in 2012 Angers  (12.88s)   
  2nd at the French Championships of 100 meters hurdles in 2013 Paris (12.70s)

Personal Bests  
 60 meters hurdles (indoors)   : 7.97 s at Aubière 19 February 2011 at the French Indoor Championships   
   100 meters hurdles (outdoor)   : 12.70s at Paris on 13   July 2013    during the French Championships.

Notes and references

External links  
 

1985 births
Living people
French female hurdlers
Doping cases in athletics
French sportspeople in doping cases
Sportspeople from Abidjan
Ivorian emigrants to France